Scobinancistrus is a genus of armored catfishes native to the southeastern Amazon (Tocantins, Xingu, Tapajós basins) in Brazil. They are black with numerous white to orange spots, and the fins can have broad reddish-orange edging.

Species
There are currently two recognized species in this genus:

 Scobinancistrus aureatus W. E. Burgess, 1994
 Scobinancistrus pariolispos Isbrücker & Nijssen, 1989

References

Loricariidae
Fish of South America
Fish of Brazil